Tianzhou or Tian Zhou may refer to:

 Tianzhou (spacecraft), automated cargo vessel derivative of Tiangong-1
 Tianzhou 1, 2017 mission of the Tianzhou spacecraft
 Tianzhou language
 Tianzhou (田州镇 tián-zhōu-zhèn), a town in Tianyang County, Baise, Guangxi, China

See also
 Tian-e-Zhou Oxbow Nature Reserve
 Zhoutian (disambiguation)